The Martlet is a bi-weekly student newspaper at the University of Victoria (UVic) in Victoria, British Columbia, Canada. There are about 10 employees on the payroll, but significant work is done by student volunteers (writing, taking photos, copy editing). The Martlet is funded partially by student fees, and partially by advertisements. As of 2017, each full-time student pays $3.75 per semester to the Martlet. The newspaper is distributed freely around the UVic campus and various locations around greater Victoria every second Thursday during the school year, and on a monthly basis in the summer. The Martlet Publishing Society is a non-profit society governed by a volunteer-run, five-position board of directors. All staff, paid or otherwise, must answer to the board, and welcomes all students to attend board meetings. 
The Martlet is the only independent campus newspaper at the University of Victoria, and therefore one of the only publications that has the time and resources to fully hold both the University of Victoria and the University of Victoria Students' Society (UVSS) accountable. The Martlet regularly reports on UVic Board of Governors and Senate meetings, as well as University of Victoria Students' Society Board meetings and elections.

Today, the Martlet has a wide circulation and can be found in coffee shops, theatres, grocery stores, offices, and street corners throughout Victoria, British Columbia. The newspaper maintains its strong editorial line and commitment to politics and activism. Many national journalists and columnists in Canada have gotten their start in writing journalism at the Martlet and it continues to produce opportunities for student writers to become professionals. Notable Martlet alumni include Andrew MacLeod of the Tyee, Victoria Mayor Lisa Helps, and Leader of the B.C. Green Party Andrew Weaver.

In recent years, the Martlet has broken stories about UVSS spending deficits, UVic's reputational enhancement project, divestment lobbying efforts by UVic student activists, issues with UVic's sexualized violence policy, the arrival of Starbucks on campus, problems in the UVic Sociology department, international student tuition hikes, student groups' support of the Unist'ot'en First Nation camp, pro-life vs. pro-choice protesters on campus, racism and antisemitism on campus, and student healthcare cuts.

The Martlet is currently undergoing a transformation as it slowly transitions to more exclusive web-only content, in line with the shifting tendencies of journalism worldwide. Along with the 5000 physical papers circulated around the UVic campus and the local community, the Martlet has over 3600 followers on Twitter and 1900 followers on Facebook. www.martlet.ca receives an annual average of 30,000 audience members via organic web search, and 17,000 audience members via social media channels.

Martlet stories are regularly picked up by larger publications including the CBC, CTV News, the Times Colonist, and Chek News.

History
The Martlet was founded when UVic was Victoria College, and the original name was the Microscope. The paper takes its name from a heraldic bird with no feet. Three martlet birds appear on the crest of McGill University, and the University of Victoria grew out of the McGill University College of British Columbia.  For a brief period in the early 1970s, the Martlet was renamed the 'Cougar City Gazette' after an armed takeover by a loose coalition of disgruntled former students and at least one former(?) professor who were dissatisfied with the perceived blandness of the newspaper - perusal of the content of the Cougar City Gazette clearly reflects the change of editorial direction. The Cougar City Gazette was often quite controversial, and its existence came to an abrupt end after it published a captioned photograph that prompted Playboy magazine to threaten the paper with legal action.

In 1971, the Martlet was partly responsible for bringing about the resignation of the university's president, Bruce J. Partridge, when it erroneously reported that he had obtained his law degree from a correspondence school under investigation as a "degree mill." In 2001, the Martlet Publishing Society issued an apology to Partridge for publishing articles that made reference to these events in an anniversary book. A 2003 Martlet article by Patrick White stated that, though Partridge legitimately acquired his degree by correspondence, rumours about Partridge's qualifications spread throughout the university. He resigned in November 1971. An article with a statement from Partridge can be found in an archived 1971 issue of the University of British Columbia's paper the Ubyssey.

Until 2004 the  Martlet had an "advertising boycott list", which has been dropped to allow for an assessment of each individual advertisement. The Martlet has received criticism for running advertisements that some readers have interpreted as sexist, notably in fall 2004 when they ran ads for "Canada's Search for the Coors Light Maxim Girl."

At a 2013 general meeting, the Martlet Publishing Society voted not to retain membership in Canadian University Press.

See also
List of student newspapers in Canada
List of newspapers in Canada
The Ring - UVic's community newspaper, published by UVic Communications
Nexus - A student newspaper from neighbouring Camosun College

References and works cited
 Article on Newspaper
 Apology to Bruce Partridge
 Martlet article on UVic scandals
 Ubyssey article from 1971(includes article on page 3 about Bruce Partridge)
 Op-ed on Coors Maxim sexism debate and some letters on the issue

External links
 Martlet homepage
 University of Victoria Students' Society
 UVic's CFUV Radio
 UVic's Cinecenta Movie Theatre

University of Victoria
Student newspapers published in British Columbia
Mass media in Victoria, British Columbia
Publications with year of establishment missing
Weekly newspapers published in British Columbia
Biweekly newspapers published in Canada